Kahwah (also transliterated as qehwa, kehwa or kahwa) is a traditional preparation of green tea (Camellia sinensis) widely consumed in India, Pakistan, Afghanistan, Iran, some regions of Central Asia.

Preparation

The Kashmiri kahwah is made by boiling green tea leaves with local saffron, cinnamon, cardamom and occasionally Kashmiri roses. It is generally served with sugar or honey and crushed nuts, usually almonds or walnuts. Some varieties are made as a herbal infusion only—without the green tea leaves.

Traditionally, kahwah is prepared in a copper kettle known as a samovar. A samovar, which originates from Russia, consists of a fire container running as a central cavity, in which live coals are placed to keep the tea warm. Around the fire container there is a space for water to boil and the tea leaves and other ingredients are mixed with the water. Kahwah may also be made in normal pots and kettles, as modern day urban living may not always permit the use of elaborate samovars. Sometimes milk is added to the Kahwah, but this is generally given to the elderly or the sick.

Peshawari Qehwa (a variety of Kahwah found in Khyber Pakhtunkhwa) is traditionally made with Jasmine tea and green cardamom. It is famously served at chaikhanas (or tea houses) of Qissa Khwani bazar.

History 
While its exact origins are unclear, kahwa tea leaves are said to have come to Kashmir through the Spice Route, which Kashmir was a central point of. Many believe that it originated during the Kushan empire in the first and second century AD. The word Kahwah in Kashmiri means "sweetened tea", though the word also seems to be related to the Turkish word for coffee (kahve) which in turn might be derived from the Arabic word "qahwah."

Traditionally, Kashmiris have always referred to kahwa as Mogul chai. Meaning this tea was introduced in the valley back then by the Mughal emperors. Historically, kahwah has been popular as a drink throughout Kashmir, Afghanistan, Central Asia, Iran and the Middle East. Even today, it remains a popular drink of choice in these regions.

Modern usage and popularity 
Today, this historically popular drink is usually served to guests or as part of a celebration dinner, and saffron (kong) is added to the kahwah for special visitors in Kashmir. It is often served in tiny, shallow cups. Kehwa in Kashmir is also commonly served after Wazwan and elaborate family dinners. The green tea leaves are brought in from the neighbouring Kangra region which has been known to historically export green tea to Kashmir, Afghanistan and other parts of Central Asia.

References

Blended tea
Green tea
Afghan cuisine
Kashmiri cuisine
Pakistani tea
Pashtun cuisine
Omani cuisine
Indian tea
Iranian drinks
Central Asian cuisine